De Ti Depende is the second solo album by Héctor Lavoe, It was released in 1976 under the label of Fania Records. 
It is famous for the song "Periodico de Ayer", which was written by Tite Curet Alonso. Arrangements by: Willie Colon ("Vamos A Reir Un Poco", "Periodico De Ayer" & "Mentira"), Louie Ramirez ("Consejo De Oro"), Louis "Perico" Ortiz ("Tanto Como Ayer" & "Felices Horas"), Jose Febles ("De Ti Depende"), and Edwin Rodriquez ("Hacha Y Machete"). Cover & Liner Photos (on Vinyl) by: Lee Marshall. Album Design by: Ron Levine.

Track listing

 "Vamos a Reir Un Poco" - 7:32 
 "De Ti Depende" - 4:33 
 "Periódico de Ayer" - 6:43 
 "Consejo de Oro" - 2:40 
 "Tanto Como Ayer" - 3:42 
 "Hacha y Machete" - 5:41 
 "Felices Horas" - 6:04 
 "Mentira" - 6:37

Personnel
Héctor Lavoe - Lead Vocals & Maracas
José Mangual, Jr. - Bongos, Percussion & Coro
Milton Cardona - Conga, Percussion & Coro
José "Profesor" Torres - Piano
Angel "Papo" Vazquez - Trombone
Harry De Aguiar - Trombone
Ray Feliciano - Trumpet
Santi "Choflomo" González - Bass
Yomo Toro - Guitar
Rubén Blades - Coro
Alfredo De La Fé - Violin (Periódico de Ayer)

References

Héctor Lavoe albums
1976 albums
Fania Records albums